The Roman Catholic Archdiocese of Bloemfontein is the Metropolitan See for the Ecclesiastical province of Bloemfontein in South Africa.

History
 1951.01.11: Established as Metropolitan Archdiocese of Bloemfontein from the Apostolic Vicariate of Aliwal and the Apostolic Vicariate of Kimberley in South Africa.

Special churches
The seat of the archbishop is  Sacred Heart Cathedral, Bloemfontein.

Metropolitan Archbishops
 Herman Joseph Meysing, O.M.I. (1951.01.11 – 1954)
 William Patrick Whelan, O.M.I. (1954.07.18 – 1966.01.10)
 Joseph Patrick Fitzgerald, O.M.I. (1966.08.06 – 1976.01.24), appointed Archbishop (personal title) of Johannesburg
 Peter Fanyana John Butelezi, O.M.I. (1978.04.27 – 1997.06.10)
 Buti Joseph Tlhagale, O.M.I. (1999.01.02 – 2003.04.08), appointed Archbishop (personal title) of Johannesburg
 Jabulani Adatus Nxumalo, O.M.I. (10 October 2005 – 1 April 2020)
 Zolile Peter Mpambani, S.C.I. (1 April 2020 – present)

Suffragan Dioceses
 Bethlehem
 Keimoes–Upington
 Kimberley
 Kroonstad

See also
Roman Catholicism in South Africa
List of Roman Catholic dioceses in South Africa

References

External links
 GCatholic.org

Roman Catholic Archdiocese
Roman Catholic dioceses in South Africa
Christian organizations established in 1951
Roman Catholic dioceses and prelatures established in the 20th century
1951 establishments in South Africa